Saint-Michel-Chef-Chef is a commune in the Loire-Atlantique department in western France.

Population

See also
Communes of the Loire-Atlantique department

References

External links

Saintmichelchefchef
Pornic Agglo Pays de Retz
Populated coastal places in France